This is a list of programs broadcast by Ion Television, both past and present.

Current programming
Source:

Note: Titles are listed in alphabetical order followed by the year of debut in parentheses.

Syndicated programming

Drama
Blue Bloods (2014)
Bones (2023)
Chicago Fire (June 15, 2021)
Chicago P.D. (2019)
Criminal Minds (2009–2021; 2022)
FBI (January 23, 2023)
Hawaii Five-0 (January 8, 2021)
Law & Order: Special Victims Unit (September 25, 2015)
MacGyver (May 2, 2022)
NCIS (2008–2010; January 9, 2022)
NCIS: Los Angeles (2017)
NCIS: New Orleans (January 5, 2021)
Leverage (2012–2019; 2022)
Leverage: Redemption (2022)

Children's programming

Original Christmas movies
Source:

Former programming

Original programming

Comedy
World Cup Comedy (2004–2005)

Drama
Body and Soul (2002–2003)
Chicken Soup for the Soul (1999–2000)
Doc (2001–2004)
Flipper (1998–2000) (as Flipper: The New Adventures)
Hope Island (1999–2000)
Just Cause (2002–2003)
Little Men (1998–1999)
Mysterious Ways (2000–2002)
Palmetto Pointe (2005)
Ponderosa (2001–2002)
Sue Thomas: F.B.Eye (2002–2005)
Young Blades (2005)

Reality and actuality programming
America's Most Talented Kid (2004–2005)
Animal Tails (2003–2004)
Animals Are People Too (1999)
Candid Camera (2001–2004)
Cold Turkey (2004–2005)
Destination Stardom (1999–2000)
Ed McMahon's Next Big Star (2001–2002)
Encounters With the Unexplained (2000–2002)
Xtreme Fakeovers (2005)
It's a Miracle (1998–2004)
Lie Detector (2005)
Masters of Illusion (2000)
Miracle Pets (2000–2005)
Model Citizens (2004)
Second Verdict (2004)
Totally Pets (2003–2004)
Treasures in Your Home (1999–2000)

Game shows
Balderdash (2004–2005)
Beat the Clock (2002–2003)
Dirty Rotten Cheater (2003)
Genesis (2000)
Hollywood Showdown (2000)
On the Cover (2004)
Opportunity Knocks (2002–2003)
The Reel to Reel Picture Show (1998)
Shop 'til You Drop (2000–2005)
Supermarket Sweep (2000–2003)
Twenty One (2000)

Talk and how-to programming
The Emeril Lagasse Show (2010)
Great Day America (1998–1999)
Woman's Day (1999)

Religious programming
Faith Under Fire (2004–2005)

Sports programming

Events
BodogFight (2007)
Champions Tour Golf
Conference USA College Football (2005–2007)
FLW Bass Fishing
Paralympic Games (2000)
Real Pro Wrestling (2005–2006)
United States Track and Field Olympic Trials (2000)
Women's United Soccer Association (2002–2003)

Programs
NFL Films Game of the Week (2007)
WWE Main Event (2012–2014)

Canadian co-productions
The Border (2009–2010)
Durham County (2007–2010)
Flashpoint (2011-2017)
The Guard (2008–2009)
Private Eyes (2018–2021)
The Listener (2012)
Saving Hope (2016)
Twice in a Lifetime (1999–2001)

Specials
12-12-12: The Concert for Sandy Relief
GMA Dove Awards
Mrs. America Pageant (2002)
Mrs. World Pageant (2001)

Children's programming (Qubo)
My Friend Rabbit
Turbo Dogs
Shelldon

Acquired programming

Children's programming (Qubo)
3-2-1 Penguins!
Babar
The Choo Choo Bob Show (2015–2017)
Dive Olly Dive (2015–2016)
Doki (2015–2016; 2016–2017)
Dragon
Finding Stuff Out (2020; 2021)
Giver (2018–2019)
Guess with Jess (2014–2015)
Harry and His Bucket Full of Dinosaurs (2014–2015)
Jacob Two-Two
Jane and the Dragon
Look Kool (2018–2019)
The Magic School Bus
Pearlie
Willa's Wild Life
Postman Pat (2007–2008)
Raggs (2016–2017)
Safari Tracks (2019–2020)
Timothy Goes to School (2014–2015)
VeggieTales (2006–2009)
Zoo Clues (2017-2018; 2019-2020)
The Zula Patrol

Syndicated programming

Children's programming
The Adventures of Super Mario Bros. 3 (1998-1999)
The Adventures of Swiss Family Robinson (1998-1999)
Archie's Weird Mysteries (1999-2000)
California Dreams (2001)
The Get-Along Gang (1998-1999)
Hurricanes (1998)
Inquiring Minds (1998-1999)
Starcom: The U.S. Space Force (1998)
Super Mario World (1998-1999)
Sylvanian Families (1998-1999)
The Toothbrush Family (1998)
Where on Earth Is Carmen Sandiego? (1999-2000)
Zak Tales (1998)

Comedy
Alice (2007–2008)
Amen (2006–2007)
Bosom Buddies (2000)
Dave's World (1998–1999, 2001–2002, 2006–2007)
Designing Women (2007–2008)
The Drew Carey Show (2007–2009)
The Facts of Life (2007–2010)
George Lopez (2011–2012)
Green Acres (2006–2007)
Growing Pains (2006–2007)
Hangin' with Mr. Cooper (2008–2009)
Here's Lucy (1998–1999)
The Hogan Family (1998–1999)
Mama's Family (2006–2008)
Married... with Children (2012–2014)
M*A*S*H (2008–2010)
The Monkees (2006)
My Name Is Earl (2009–2013)
Perfect Strangers (2007)
Pushing Daisies (2012)
Reba (2009)
The Steve Harvey Show (2008–2009)
The Wayans Bros. (2008)
Welcome Back, Kotter (2006–2007)
Who's the Boss? (2007–2008)
The Wonder Years (2007)

Drama
The 10th Kingdom (miniseries, 2000)
Battlestar Galactica (2007)
The Big Valley (1998–2001)
Blue Skies (1998-1999)
Bonanza (1998–2007)
Boston Legal (2008–2009)
Burn Notice (2013–2017)
Castle (2011-2023)
Charlie's Angels (2006–2007)
Christy (1998–2001)
Cold Case (2012–2015)
Criminal Minds: Suspect Behavior (2015)
CSI: Crime Scene Investigation (2018–2019)
CSI: Miami (2020-2021)
The Dead Zone (2008)
Diagnosis: Murder (1998–2007)
Dr. Quinn, Medicine Woman (1999–2000)
Early Edition (2003–2006)
Eight Is Enough (1998–2001)
ER (2008–2009)
Father Dowling Mysteries (1998–2000)
Ghost Whisperer (2009–2016)
Highway to Heaven (1998–2000)
House (2012–2013)
I'll Fly Away (1998–1999)
Kojak (2007)
Kung Fu (2007)
Law & Order (2015–2021)
Law & Order: Criminal Intent (2012–2020)
Life Goes On (1998–2000)
The Love Boat (1998–1999)
Medical Center (1998–1999)
Medium (2009–2012)
Monk (2011–2014)
Numb3rs (2012–2017)
Our House (2000–2001)
Promised Land (2001–2002)
Psych (2011-2018)
Quantum Leap (2008–2009)
Remington Steele (2000–2002)
Rookie Blue (2014–2015)
Scarecrow and Mrs. King (2000–2002)
Shark (2010)
Touched by an Angel (1998–2002)
White Collar (2013–2014)
Without a Trace (2009–2014)

Reality and actuality programming
America's Funniest Home Videos (2003–2005, reruns of the Bob Saget run from Seasons 1 to 5)
Jack Hanna's Animal Adventures (1998–2000)
Moral Court (2007)
The People's Court (Wapner version)
Texas Justice (2010)

Religion
Programming from The Worship Network (1998–2005; aired on a subchannel of Ion-owned stations until 2010)

Game shows
Born Lucky (1999–2000)
Family Feud (2008–2010, episodes hosted by John O'Hurley)
Pyramid (2004–2006, episodes of the version hosted by Donny Osmond)
Shop 'til You Drop (1999–2000, reruns of the Family Channel and Lifetime versions)
Supermarket Sweep (1999, reruns of the Lifetime version)
The Weakest Link (2001–2003)

News and information
48 Hours
Local NBC News primetime news broadcasts and/or rebroadcasts (select stations, 2000–2005)
MoneyWatchTV.com (2000–2001)
WeatherVision (2000–2005)

See also

Ion Media

Notes

References

 
ION